Harka Haroyu (born Hagereselam, Ethiopia 1959) was the Minister of Justice of Ethiopia from 2002 to 2005.

Haroyu was a member of Parliament for Hagere-Selam constituency. He lost the seat on 15 May 2005 and won the seat again after a later election.

References 

Living people
Government ministers of Ethiopia
Members of the House of Peoples' Representatives
People from Tigray Region
1959 births
21st-century Ethiopian politicians